Sam Williams (born 1969) is an American journalist.  He is perhaps best known as the author of a biography of software programmer Richard Stallman, Free as in Freedom: Richard Stallman's Crusade for Free Software (2002).  Prior to beginning Free as in Freedom he met his wife Tracy.  She had originally proposed the concept of the book to him.

References

External links

 
 
 

1969 births
Living people
20th-century American journalists
American male journalists